Group B was a set of regulations for grand touring (GT) vehicles used in sports car racing and rallying introduced in 1982 by the Fédération Internationale de l'Automobile (FIA). Although permitted to enter a GT class of the World Sportscar Championship alongside the more popular racing prototypes of Group C, Group B are commonly associated with the international rallying scene during 1982 to 1986 in popular culture, when they were the highest class used across rallying, including the World Rally Championship, regional and national championships.

The Group B regulations fostered some of the fastest, most powerful, and most sophisticated rally cars ever built and their era is commonly referred to as the golden era of rallying. However, a series of major accidents, some fatal, were blamed on their outright speed with lack of crowd control at events. After the death of Henri Toivonen and his co-driver Sergio Cresto in the 1986 Tour de Corse, the FIA banned the group from competing in the WRC from the following season, dropped its prior plans to introduce Group S, and designated Group A as the top-line formula with engine limits of 2000 cc and 300 bhp.

In the following years, ex-rally Group B cars found a niche in the European Rallycross Championship until being dropped in 1993. By 1991 the World Sportscar Championship had moved on from Group B and C, with the GT championships formed in the nineties preferring other classes such as the new Group GT. The last cars were homologated in Group B in 1993, though the FIA made provisions for national championships and domestic racing until as late as 2011.

Overview

New FISA groups 

In 1982 the FISA restructured the production car category of Appendix J to consist of three new groups. The outgoing Group 1 and Group 2 were replaced with Group N and Group A for unmodified and modified production touring cars respectively. These cars had to have four seats (although the minimum size of the rear seats was small enough that some 2+2 cars could qualify) and be produced in large numbers. Their homologation requirement was 5000 units in a 12 month period between 1982 and 1992. From 1993 the requirement reduced to 2500 units.

Group B was for grand touring (GT) cars with a minimum two seats, redefined as sports grand touring cars in 1986. It combined and replaced Group 3 and Group 4, two grand touring groups already used in rallying, and the production-derived special builds of Group 5 used in circuit racing. Group 5 had never been permitted in the World Rally Championship for Manufacturers.

Homologation 
The number of cars required for homologation, 200, was just 4% of the other groups' requirement and half what was previously accepted in Group 4. As the homologation periods could be extended by producing only 10% of the initial requirement each subsequent year, 20 in Group B's case compared to 500 for A and N, the group made motorsport and the championships more accessible for car manufacturers before taking the group's technicalities and performance into account. 'Evolutions' could be included within the original homologation without needing to produce a new initial run, allowing manufacturers to tweak various aspects of their competing car within the requirement to produce only 20 'evolved' cars. Together, these homologation rules resulted in Group B 'homologation specials' (cars that were only produced to satisfy the group quota rather than for sales) extremely rare, if they continued to exist beyond presentation to FIA officials in the first place.

Group B could be used to homologate production sports cars which could not be homologated in Group N or A, because they did not have four seats or were not produced in large enough numbers (e.g. cars like the Ferrari 308, the Porsche 911, etc.). Further, the low production requirement encouraged manufacturers to use space frame chassis instead of bodyshells typically used in most series-production road cars.

Existing cars within Group 2, Group 3 and Group 4 homologation could be transferred to Group B, with many being automatically transferred by the FISA secretariat.

Regulations

Specific regulations 
Group B had few specific rules outside those covering all groups in Article 252 and 253, which covered such things as safety cages or parts defining a car like windscreens or rear view mirrors. Article 256 covered the specific regulations for Group B with 5 paragraphs over half a page. The first two paragraphs covered the definition, (Sports) Grand Touring Cars (with a minimum of two seats), and the homologation requirements. 

Fittings and modifications were inherited from those allowed in Group A. Rather than being restrictions, these covered those items (not) expected to be applied to a production car that would/wouldn't be expected on a competition car. Example include the removal of trims, soundproofing, HVAC systems, ignition systems or the reinforcing of chassis, tuning of engine and transmission parts etc. 

Weight restrictions were applied on a scale in relation to the engine cylinder capacity. The minimum weight was 580 kg for engine below 1000 cc, to 1,300 kg for engines over 5,000 cc. The final specific rule applied to wheel sizes, which were similarly applied in a scale related to engine cylinder capacity.

Resulting builds 

Ultimately there were few restrictions on technology, design or materials permitted. For example fibreglass bodywork was used in the case of the Ford RS200, a car without a commercially available counterpart, though silhouette race cars using space frame chassis were still common even when consumer car equivalents were mass produced, for example in the case of the Peugeot 205 T16 or Lancia Delta S4. 

The rules provided for manufacturers who wanted to compete in rallying with mid-engine and RWD or 4WD, but their RWD production models had been gradually replaced by FWD counterparts. By reducing the homologation minimum from 400 in Group 4 to 200, FISA enabled manufacturers to design specialised RWD or 4WD rally car homologation specials without the financial commitment of producing their production counterparts in such large numbers. 

There were no restrictions on boost, resulting in the power output of the winning cars increasing from 250 hp in 1981, to there being at least two cars producing in excess of 500 by 1986, the final year of Group B in rally. Turbocharged engines weren't common in commercial cars and had only been introduced since the mid-1970s, but in the early and mid-1980s engineers learnt how to extract extraordinary amounts of power from turbo engines. Some Group B manufacturers went further, Peugeot for example, installed an F1-derived Turbo Lag system to their engine, although the technology was new and not very effective. Lancia twincharged their Delta S4, adding both a supercharger and turbocharger to their engine. When the Group N, A and B rules were decided, the weight/engine displacement restrictions were thought the only way to control speed. Nowadays, the power of turbo engines is limited by mandating a restrictor in the intake, and the Groups Rally hierarchy for example, each have limits on weight/engine power (kg/hp). 

Within all the groups, there were 15 classes based on engine displacement with a 1.4 equivalence factor applied for forced induction engines. Each class had weight limits and wheel sizes. Notable classes for Group B were the 3000 cc class (2142.8 cc with turbo or supercharger), 960 kg minimum weight (Audi Quattro, Lancia 037); and 2500 cc (1785 cc), 890 kg (Peugeot 205 T16, Lancia Delta S4).

The original Renault 5 Turbo had a 1.4 L engine so it was in the 2000 cc class. Renault later increased the size of the engine somewhat for the Turbo Maxi, so as to be able to fit larger tyres (at the expense of somewhat higher weight). The Ferrari 288 GTO and the Porsche 959 were in the 4000 cc (2857 cc), 1100 kg class, which would have probably become the normal class for track racing if Group B had seen much use there.
 
Classes in Group B:

Rallying

1982-1983 

The existing Groups 1-4 were still permitted in the World Rally Championship during the first year of the new groups. Although some freshly homologated Group B cars were entered from the first round in Monte Carlo, no car from the group podiumed at any of the season's 12 rallies.

Although the Audi Quattro was still in essence a Group 4 car, it carried Hannu Mikkola to the driver's title in 1983. Lancia had designed a new car to Group B specifications, but the Lancia 037 still had rear wheel drive and was thus less stable than the Audi over different surfaces (generally the Lancia had the upper hand on tarmac, but the Audi remained superior on looser surfaces such as snow and gravel). Nevertheless, the 037 performed well enough for Lancia to capture the manufacturers title, which was generally considered more prestigious at the time, with a rally to spare. In fact, so low was Lancia's regard for the Drivers Championship, they did not enter a single car into the season finale RAC Rally, despite the fact that driver Walter Röhrl was still in the hunt for the title.

The low homologation requirements quickly attracted manufacturers to Group B. Opel replaced their production-derived Ascona with the Group B Manta 400, and Toyota built a new car based on their Celica. Like the Lancia 037, both cars were rear wheel drive, and while proving successful in national rallying in various countries, they were less so at the World Championship level, although Toyota won the 1983 Ivory Coast Rally after hiring Swedish desert driving specialist, the late Björn Waldegård.

1984-1985 

In 1984, Audi beat Lancia for both the manufacturers' title and the drivers' title, the latter of which was won by Stig Blomqvist, but received an unexpected new competition midway through the year: Peugeot had joined the rallying scene with its Group B 205 T16. The T16 also had four wheel drive and was smaller and lighter than the Audi Quattro. At the wheel was the 1981 driver's champion Ari Vatanen, with future Ferrari Formula One team manager and FIA President Jean Todt overseeing the operation. A crash prevented the T16 from winning its first rally but the writing was on the wall for Audi.

Despite massive revisions to the Quattro, including a shorter wheelbase, Peugeot dominated the 1985 season. Although not without mishap: Vatanen plunged off the road in Argentina and was seriously injured when his seat mountings broke in the ensuing crash. Timo Salonen won the 1985 champion title with five wins.

Although the crash was a sign that Group B cars had already become dangerously quick (despite Vatanen having a consistent record of crashing out while leading), several new Group B cars entered the rallying world in 1985:
 Late in the year, Lancia replaced their outclassed 037 with the Delta S4, which featured both a turbocharger and a supercharger for optimum power output.
 Ford returned after several years away with the Ford RS200 and the Ford Sierra RS Cosworth (though the latter went on to compete in Group A).
 Citroën developed and entered the BX 4TC, which had proven too heavy and cumbersome to be successful.
 Rover created the distinctive Metro 6R4, which featured boxy bodywork and a large spoiler mounted on the front of the car.

1986 

For the 1986 season, defending champion Timo Salonen had the new Evolution 2 version of Peugeot's 205 T16 with ex Toyota driver, Juha Kankkunen. Audi's new Sport Quattro S1 boasted over 600 hp (450 kW) and a huge snowplough-like front end. Lancia's Delta S4 would be in the hands of the Finnish prodigy Henri Toivonen and Markku Alén, and Ford was ready with its high tech RS200 with Stig Blomqvist and Kalle Grundel.

On the "Lagoa Azul" stage of the Portuguese Rally near Sintra, Portuguese driver Joaquim Santos crested a rise, turning to his right to avoid a small group of spectators. This caused him to lose control of his RS200. The car veered to the right and slid off the road into the spectators. Thirty-one people were injured and three were killed. All the top teams immediately pulled out of the rally and Group B was placed in jeopardy.

Disaster struck again in early May at the Tour de Corse. Lancia's Toivonen was the championship favorite, and once the rally got underway he was the pace setter. Seven kilometres into the 18th stage, Toivonen's S4 flew off the unguarded edge of a tightening left hand bend and plunged down a steep wooded hillside. The car landed inverted with the fuel tanks ruptured by the impact. The combination of red hot turbocharger, Kevlar bodywork, and ruptured fuel tank ignited the car and set fire to the dry undergrowth. Toivonen and co-driver Sergio Cresto died in their seats. With no witnesses to the accident it was impossible to determine what caused the crash other than Toivonen had left the road at high speed. Some cite Toivonen's ill health at the time (he reportedly was suffering from flu); others suggest mechanical failure, or simply the difficulty of driving the car, although Toivonen, like Vatanen, had a career full of crashing out while leading rallies. Up until that stage he was leading the rally by a large margin, with no other driver challenging him.

The crash came a year after Lancia driver Attilio Bettega had crashed and died in his 037. While that fatality was largely blamed on the unforgiving Corsican scenery (and bad luck, as his co-driver, Maurizio Perissinot, was unharmed), Toivonen and Cresto's deaths, combined with the Portugal tragedy and televised accident of F1 driver Marc Surer in another RS200 which killed co-driver Michel Wyder, compelled the FIA to ban all Group B cars immediately for 1987. Audi decided to quit Group B entirely after the Corsica rally.

The final days of Group B were also controversial. The Peugeots were disqualified from the Rally Sanremo by the Italian scrutineers as the 'skirts' around the bottom of the car were found to be illegal. Peugeot immediately accused the Italians of favouring Lancia. Their case was strengthened at the next event, the RAC Rally, when the British scrutineers passed the Peugeots as legal in identical trim. FISA annulled the result of the Sanremo Rally eleven days after the final round in the United States. As a result, the championship title was passed from Lancia's Markku Alén to Peugeot's Juha Kankkunen. Timo Salonen had won another two rallies during the 1986 season and became the most successful group B era driver with a total of seven wins.

Beyond WRC 

Although 1987 saw the end of Group B rally car development and their appearance on the world rally scene, they did not disappear. They were still permitted in regional championships providing they met the limit of 1600cc for four-wheel-drive or were homologated prior to 1984. Future FIA president Mohammed Ben Sulayem was one privateer who contested rounds of the 1987 Middle East Rally Championship in an Audi Quattro A2 and Opel Manta 400. Independent teams would enter the European Championship too, though the limited options of permitted Group B cars were not as competitive or ubiquitous as newer Group A cars. 

Porsche's 959 never entered a WRC event, although it did compete in the Middle East championship and won the Paris-Dakar Rally in 1986. Peugeot adapted their T16 to run in the Dakar Rally. Ari Vatanen won the event in 1987, 1989 and 1990. Improved Peugeot and Audi cars also competed in the Pikes Peak Hillclimb in Colorado. Walter Röhrl's S1 Rally car won the Pikes Peak International Hill Climb in 1987 and set a new record at the time. Audi used their Group B experience to develop a production based racing car for the Trans-Am and IMSA GTO series in 1988 and 1989 respectively. 

Many ex-rally cars found homes in European Rallycross events from the beginning of 1987 until the end of 1992. The MG Metro 6R4 and Ford RS200 became frequent entries in national championships. For 1993, the FIA replaced the Group B models in the European Rallycross Championship with prototypes that had to be based on existing Group A models.

Group S 

As well as the cancellation of Group B, the tragedies of 1986 also brought about the scrapping of Group B's proposed replacement: Group S.

Group S rules would have limited car engine power to 300 hp (225 kW). To encourage innovative designs, ten examples of a car would have been required for homologation, rather than the 200 required for Group B. By the time of its cancellation, at least four Group S prototypes had been built: The Lancia ECV, the Toyota MR2-based 222D, the Opel Kadett Rallye 4x4 (a.k.a. Vauxhall Astra 4S) and the Lada Samara S-proto, and new cars were also planned by both Audi (the 002 Quattro) and Ford (a Group S modification of the RS200). The cancellation of Group S angered many rally insiders who believed the new specification to be safer than Group B and more exciting than Group A.

The Group S concept was revived by the FIA in 1997 as the World Rally Car specification, which persisted until 2021.

Circuit racing 

From their introduction in 1982 Group B found a home in the World Endurance Championship, a new name for the World Sports Car Championship, though were secondary to the racing prototype Group C cars. The 1983 season had the first significant entry list including Porsche 930, BMW M1 and Ferrari 308 GTB LM vehicles. Porsche won the FIA GT Cup in 1983, handing it over to BMW in 1984 and 1985. From 1986 the championship retired Group B in favour of IMSA regulated cars and the championship became known as the World Sports-Prototype Championship the same year.

The Porsche 961 prototype, intended to be the basis for a Group B homologation, won the GTX class at the 24 Hours of Le Mans 1986 race but crashed and caught fire in 1987. The Ferrari 288 GTO was built and sold the minimum requirement of cars to the public, but never saw action in its category. The WSPC grids it was intended for was filled up by a batch of Group C cars (there would be no production sports car-based racers in European racing, including Le Mans, until 1993), but it saw limited use in an IMSA GTO race in 1989.

Legacy 

The era of Group B is often considered one of the most competitive and compelling periods in rallying. The combination of a lightweight chassis, sophisticated aerodynamics and massive amounts of horsepower resulted in the development of a class of cars whose performance has not yet been surpassed within their category, even three decades later. In reference to their dubious safety record, the class has also earned an unsavoury nickname among rally enthusiasts: "Killer B's". In contrast to this, many enthusiasts refer the Group B era as the Golden Age of Rallying.

Many racing video games feature Group B cars for the player to drive. The 2017 video game Gran Turismo Sport features a rally car category known as "Gr. B", an obvious homage to Group B. This particular category features predominantly fictional rally cars based on newer models, such as the Mitsubishi Lancer Evolution X and the Subaru WRX STI, although it does include the Pikes Peak version of the Audi Quattro. For the game's sequel, Gran Turismo 7, an actual Group B car (the Peugeot 205) was added to the class.

Cars

Group B

This list includes under-development and prototype cars that did not receive homologation.

Notes

Group S

 Audi Sport Quattro RS 002
 Ford RS200
 Lada Samara S-proto
 Lancia ECV
 Mazda RX7S
 Opel Kadett Rallye 4x4/Vauxhall Astra 4S
 Peugeot 405 T16 GR
 SEAT Ibiza Bimotor
 Škoda 130LR Evolution
 Toyota 222D (based upon MR2)

Notable drivers

  Markku Alén
  Attilio Bettega
  Miki Biasion
  Stig Blomqvist
  Marian Bublewicz
  John Buffum
  Juha Kankkunen
  Shekhar Mehta
  Hannu Mikkola
  Michèle Mouton
  Tony Pond
  Jean Ragnotti
  Jorge Recalde
  Walter Röhrl
  Timo Salonen
  Henri Toivonen
  Ari Vatanen
  Björn Waldegård

References

Group B
World Rally Championship
Fédération Internationale de l'Automobile
 
Rally groups
Racing car classes
Auto racing controversies